In chemistry, the lattice energy is the energy change upon formation of one mole of a crystalline ionic compound from its constituent ions, which are assumed to initially be in the gaseous state.  It is a measure of the cohesive forces that bind ionic solids.  The size of the lattice energy is connected to many other physical properties including solubility, hardness, and volatility.  Since it generally cannot be measured directly, the lattice energy is usually deduced from experimental data via the Born–Haber cycle.

Lattice energy and lattice enthalpy

The concept of lattice energy was originally applied to the formation of compounds with structures like rocksalt (NaCl) and sphalerite (ZnS) where the ions occupy high-symmetry crystal lattice sites. In the case of NaCl, lattice energy is the energy change of the reaction
 Na+ (g) + Cl− (g) → NaCl (s)
which amounts to −786 kJ/mol.

Some chemistry textbooks as well as the widely used CRC Handbook of Chemistry and Physics define lattice energy with the opposite sign, i.e. as the energy required to convert the crystal into infinitely separated gaseous ions in vacuum, an endothermic process.  Following this convention, the lattice energy of NaCl would be +786 kJ/mol. Both sign conventions are widely used.

The relationship between the lattice energy and the lattice enthalpy at pressure  is given by the following equation:
, 
where  is the lattice energy (i.e., the molar internal energy change),  is the lattice enthalpy, and  the change of molar volume due to the formation of the lattice. Since the molar volume of the solid is much smaller than that of the gases, . The formation of a crystal lattice from ions in vacuum must lower the internal energy due to the net attractive forces involved, and so . The  term is positive but is relatively small at low pressures, and so the value of the lattice enthalpy is also negative (and exothermic).

Theoretical treatments
The lattice energy of an ionic compound depends strongly upon the charges of the ions that comprise the solid, which must attract or repel one another via Coulomb's Law. More subtly, the relative and absolute sizes of the ions influence  . London dispersion forces also exist between ions and contribute to the lattice energy via polarization effects. For ionic compounds made of molecular cations and/or anions, there may also be ion-dipole and dipole-dipole interactions if either molecule has a molecular dipole moment.  The theoretical treatments described below are focused on compounds made of atomic cations and anions, and neglect contributions to the internal energy of the lattice from thermalized lattice vibrations.

Born–Landé equation

In 1918 Born and Landé proposed that the lattice energy could be derived from the electric potential of the ionic lattice and a repulsive potential energy term.

where
NA is the Avogadro constant;
M is the Madelung constant, relating to the geometry of the crystal;
z+ is the charge number of the cation;
z− is the charge number of the anion;
r0 is the nearest-neighbor distance between ions; and
n is the Born exponent (a number between 5 and 12, determined experimentally by measuring the compressibility of the solid, or derived theoretically).

The Born–Landé equation above shows that the lattice energy of a compound depends principally on two factors:
 as the charges on the ions increase, the lattice energy increases (becomes more negative),
 when ions are closer together the lattice energy increases (becomes more negative)
Barium oxide (BaO), for instance, which has the NaCl structure and therefore the same Madelung constant, has a bond radius of 275 picometers and a lattice energy of −3054 kJ/mol, while sodium chloride (NaCl) has a bond radius of 283 picometers and a lattice energy of −786 kJ/mol. The bond radii are similar but the charge numbers are not, with BaO having charge numbers of (+2,−2) and NaCl having (+1,−1); the Born–Landé equation predicts that the difference in charge numbers is the principal reason for the large difference in lattice energies.

Closely related to this widely used formula is the Kapustinskii equation, which can be used as a simpler way of estimating lattice energies where high precision is not required.

Effect of polarization 

For certain ionic compounds, the calculation of the lattice energy requires the explicit inclusion of polarization effects. In these cases the polarization energy Epol associated with ions on polar lattice sites may be included in the Born–Haber cycle. As an example, one may consider the case of iron-pyrite FeS2. It has been shown that neglect of polarization led to a 15% difference between theory and experiment in the case of FeS2, whereas including it reduced the error to 2%.

Representative lattice energies 
The following table presents a list of lattice energies for some common compounds as well as their structure type.

See also 
 Bond energy
 Born–Haber cycle
 Chemical bond
 Madelung constant
 Ionic conductivity
 Enthalpy of melting
 Enthalpy change of solution
 Heat of dilution

Notes

References

Crystallography
Solid-state chemistry